This is a list of British television related events from 2004.

Events

January
1 January – Thomas and the Magic Railroad makes its Network television premiere on BBC One.
2 January – The BBC cancels the appearance of Coca-Cola sponsorship credits in the music charts in its BBC One Top of the Pops show, after criticism from politicians and health campaigners that it would be promoting junk food and unhealthy drink products to teenagers.
3 January - CD:UK broadcasts its first episode in 16:9 widescreen.
4 January – 
ITV introduces a sixth weekly episode of Emmerdale airing on Sunday evenings at 7:00 pm. The episode is dropped in 2008 to allow for one-hour episodes on Tuesdays.
Debut of the Channel 4 reality series Shattered in which ten contestants are challenged with going without sleep for seven days while their actions are constantly monitored. Over the seven days the ten housemates must undergo daily performance testing and a variety of challenges, while competing for a potential prize fund of £100,000, which is reduced by £1,000 every time a contestant closes their eyes for more than ten seconds. The series, and the remaining prize money of £97,000, is won by Clare Southern on 10 January. It is subsequently branded as "misconceived and dangerous" by the British Association for Counselling and Psychotherapy, although Channel 4 says that sleep experts were consulted when putting together the series and that care was taken with the selection of participants.
 5 January – 
BBC One introduces the Massai ident that features nine native Maasai tribesmen dancing in the centre alongside warriors Jumping Up & Down On The Grass.
CITV introduces a first weekly episode of The Sleepover Club.  
9 January – The BBC announces that the Kilroy talk show will be taken off air while the Corporation investigates negative comments its presenter Robert Kilroy-Silk made about Arabic people in the previous weekend's Sunday Express.
 10 January – The first edition of ITV's new Saturday morning children's programme Ministry of Mayhem is broadcast on ITV (later CITV).
13 January – Acclaimed US medical drama Nip/Tuck makes its British television debut on Sky One, attracting an audience of 1 million. The series had been heavily publicised on terrestrial television prior to its broadcast.
15 January – BBC Four begins a six-part adaptation of the Alan Clark Diaries, starring John Hurt and Jenny Agutter. The series concludes on 17 February, and is later repeated on BBC Two.
16 January – Robert Kilroy-Silk resigns as a BBC One talk show host after 17 years following the controversy over comments he made about Arabs.
25 January - The fourth and final series of The Story Makers premieres on CBeebies.
28 January – The Hutton Inquiry into the circumstances of the death of Dr. David Kelly is published. This is taken by most of the press to strongly condemn the BBC's handling of the David Kelly affair and to exonerate the government. The Director-General of the BBC, Greg Dyke, chairman of the Board of Governors, Gavyn Davies, and the journalist at the centre of the controversy, Andrew Gilligan, resign. The UK media in general condemns the report as a whitewash.
29 January – Mark Byford becomes acting Director-General of the BBC following Greg Dyke's resignation.
30 January – ITV's News at Ten ends for a second time, with its replacement, the News at 10:30, launching the following Monday.
January – SMG sells its stake in Scottish Radio Holdings to EMAP for £90 million in anticipation of consolidation in the radio market.

February
2 February – 
ITV plc is formed from the merger of Carlton and Granada. The new company controls 90% of the ITV network.
The News at 10:30 debuts on ITV1.
SMG's sells its stake in GMTV to ITV plc for £31 million.
4 February – 
ITV announce the comedian Bradley Walsh is to join Coronation Street as the nephew of factory owner Mike Baldwin (Johnny Briggs). The news comes as it is announced that five actors will leave the soap over the next twelve months—Adam Rickitt (Nick Tilsley), Susie Blake (Bev Unwin), Iain Rogerson (Harry Flagg), Katherine Hunt (Angela Harris) and Thomas Craig (Tommy Harris). Beverley Callard (Liz McDonald) and Jane Danson (Leanne Battersby) are also set to return to the series in the summer.
UKTV announce plans to rebrand all their UK prefix channels as UKTV. UK Horizons will also be replaced by UKTV Documentary and UKTV People from 8 March.
Five confirms that The Terry and Gaby Show will be axed when it finishes its current run on 26 March.
5 February – Five actors from Coronation Street are axed by new producer Tony Wood. Adam Rickitt (Nick Tilsley), Susie Blake (Bev Unwin), Iain Rogerson (Harry Flagg), Katherine Hunt (Angela Harris) and Thomas Craig (Tommy Harris) will all leave when their contracts come to an end.
9 February – Kerry McFadden wins the third series of ITV1's I'm a Celebrity... Get Me Out of Here!.
13 February – Sky One airs the inaugural EuroMillions draw at 9pm, the first time a National Lottery draw has been aired on commercial television.
15 February – 
Debut of ITV's How to Holiday, presented by Jenni Falconer and Dominic Littlewood. The programme has both presenters visiting the same location, with Falconer travelling in luxury while Littlewood travels on a budget.
Debut of Five's Back to Reality, a reality television programme featuring 12 contestants from other reality shows (such as Big Brother, The Salon and Pop Idol) spending three weeks in a purpose-built house, competing to become "Britain's most popular reality star". Deriving many of its ideas from other shows, the programme receives poor ratings and a solicitor's letter from Endemol because of its perceived similarity to Celebrity Big Brother.
16 February – BBC Network news titles are relaunched in the style of BBC News 24, which were introduced in December 2003.
27 February – 
Reports emerge of discussions between Channel 4 and Five aimed at a merger between the two channels.
29 February – Transmission date of the final edition of London Tonight to be produced by the London News Network. After this date its news operation is absorbed into ITN.

March
5 March – Major James Hewitt wins Five's Back to Reality.
7 March – An edition of ITV London's The Week is the final London News Network produced programme to be aired. 
8 March – 
All 'UK' prefix TV channels are rebranded to UKTV. For example, UK Bright Ideas is rebranded UKTV Bright Ideas, and UK History becomes UKTV History.
Brooke Kinsella, who plays Kelly Taylor in EastEnders, announces she will be leaving the soap after two and a half years, departing in the summer.
13 March – Charles Ngandwe, performing as Paul Robeson, wins the fifteenth series of Stars in Their Eyes. The edition is also the last to be presented by Matthew Kelly, who had announced the previous day that he would be leaving the series. The role of presenter is taken over by Cat Deeley.
14 March – Channel 4 airs the documentary He's Starsky, I'm Hutch, a programme which prompts actor David Soul to write an open letter to the channel complaining about the way he was portrayed in the film. Soul had co-operated with the documentary, but felt it betrayed because it had concentrated too much on the negative aspects of his life.
18 March – FremantleMedia confirms plans to bring the popular US TV series The Apprentice to the UK.
21 March – "An Apple a Day", an episode of Last of the Summer Wine aired on BBC One in which Billy Hardcastle does not appear.
22 March – Christopher Eccleston is announced as the ninth actor to play The Doctor in Doctor Who. A new 13-part series will be filmed in Cardiff later in the year and make its debut in 2005.
27 March – Following two years, The Story Makers airs the last ever episode. 
29 March – BBC Two Controller Jane Root will leave her role to take up a position with the Discovery Network in the United States, it is reported.
31 March – The LWT logo is seen on screen for the final time, having continued to appear as an endcap after the formation of ITV plc.
March – 
Launch of the Islam Channel.
A new pay television service on digital terrestrial television, Top Up TV, launches. It offers ten channels, each of which broadcasts on a part-time basis.

April
1 April – 
It is reported that ITV have axed On the Ball after losing the broadcast rights to screen Premiership highlights. It will disappear from the schedule at the end of the current season.
BBC One airs Pat and Mo, an EastEnders spin-off episode featuring Pat Butcher and Mo Harris during the 1950s.
2 April – Michael Grade is appointed as new BBC chairman, taking over the role from Gavyn Davies, who stepped down in the wake of the Hutton Report.
3 April – CITV airs the premiere of the Japanese-American TV series based on the Sonic the Hedgehog game series, Sonic X.
7 April – Former Bad Girls actress Debra Stephenson is to join Coronation Street as new character Frankie Baldwin. She will be seen onscreen from June.
12 April – Magdalen College, Oxford wins the 2003–04 series of University Challenge, beating Gonville and Caius College, Cambridge 190–160.
13 April – BBC Two airs the television debut of Hawking, a drama about the life and work of theoretical physicist Professor Stephen Hawking, and which stars Benedict Cumberbatch in the title role.
15 April – ITV announce plans for Vote for Me, a Pop Idol-style contest to find a Parliamentary candidate. The series will be presented by Jonathan Maitland.
19 April –
 Tots TV begins screenings on CBeebies and BBC Two, as part of a broadcast deal between the BBC and Carlton, who distributed the series.
 60 Minute Makeover debuts on ITV1.
20 April – BBC Two celebrates 40 years on air by broadcasting Happy Birthday BBC Two.
23 April – ITV unveils plans for The X Factor, a new music talent contest developed by Pop Idol judge Simon Cowell that will see a panel of judges mentoring acts and competing against each other to have their act chosen as the winner.
24 April – Computer programmer and quiz expert Pat Gibson becomes the fourth contestant to win the £1 million prize on Who Wants to Be a Millionaire?. 
26 April – Michael Parkinson is to take his Parkinson chat show to ITV after the network poached him from the BBC, it is reported. Parkinson's decision to make the move was also influenced by BBC plans to move his show to a different time slot to make way for the return of Match of the Day. His final BBC show is recorded on 29 April for transmission on 8 May.
27 April – The BBC's Programme Complaints Committee rules that an episode of EastEnders that dealt with the aftermath of the rape of a character was unsuitable for family viewing after it received several complaints from viewers. Complaints about the episode are also later upheld by Ofcom.
 April – The newly created ITV plc purchases NTL's 35% stake in the ITV News Channel.

May
2 May – Merseybeat actress Leslie Ash's publicist has released a statement saying that she is undergoing treatment in hospital for "an unknown infection", which she is believed to have contracted during an earlier hospital stay. Ash was treated for a broken rib and collapsed lung a few days earlier, which she said had occurred as a result of her falling onto a table during lovemaking with her husband, former footballer Lee Chapman. The infection has left Ash with partial loss of feeling below the waist, but she is said to be responding to treatment and is described as stable. The infection is subsequently diagnosed as Methicillin-Sensitive Staphylococcus aureus, a bug that attacks the nervous system. Following her recovery, Ash later speaks about how she almost died from the infection. She is also left requiring the aid of crutches to walk.
7 May – The BBC airs its final episode of The Simpsons, having lost the broadcasting rights to Channel 4 in February 2002. Behind the Laughter is the last episode shown on the BBC. However, broadcasting rights were held until 2006, two years later.
8 May – The final edition of Parkinson to air on BBC One. Guests include The Corrs, Boris Becker, Jamie Cullum and Patrick Kielty.
14 May – BBC Four Controller Roly Keating is appointed to succeed Jane Root as Controller of BBC Two.
15 May – 
Strictly Come Dancing makes its debut on BBC One.
Ukraine's Ruslana wins the 2004 Eurovision Song Contest with "Wild Dances".
Paul Cowperthwaite, performing as Michael Jackson wins the third junior series of Stars in Their Eyes.
19 May – 
A UK version of the popular US TV series The Apprentice is to be produced for the BBC, with Amstrad founder and chairman Sir Alan Sugar as presenter. Applications will be invited for 14 candidates to take part in the programme, which will air in 2005.
Martin Bashir is to leave ITV after signing a deal to work for the US ABC network, where he will be a correspondent on its 20/20 news programme.
21 May – Mark Thompson is appointed new Director-General of the BBC.
24 May – Former pop star Billie Piper is announced as the new Doctor Who companion Rose Tyler. 
26 May – As part of a government trial to test the feasibility of switching the UK to digital television, Ferryside and Llansteffan, two towns in Carmarthenshire, have been chosen to become the first places in the UK to have their analogue signal switched off. Residents who do not currently have access to digital television will be provided with set-top boxes to enable them to receive a digital signal before the analogue transmitter is turned off later in the year. The government hopes to convert the UK to digital television by 2010.
27 May – Channel 4 airs Paul Greengrass's controversial film Omagh, a graphic portrayal of the events surrounding the Omagh bombing. The film, which took two years to research and make, had previously received a cinema showing that was attended by victims and their families, and later goes on general release.
28 May – Channel 4 airs the final episode of US sitcom Friends, with the episode watched by 8.6 million viewers.
31 May – Long running children's animated television series Peppa Pig premieres on Nick Jr. and Five.

June
2 June – Friday the 13th: The Final Chapter makes its Network television premiere on ITV1.
4 June – 
BBC News reports that having been axed by BBC America in September 2003, EastEnders will air in the US once again. Episodes will appear on the subscription channel Dish Network, beginning from where BBC America left the series.
Kitten Pinder is evicted from the Big Brother UK house, shouting against The Queen and the aristocracy on the way out. She is the first contestant to be evicted by the show's producers rather than through an audience vote after she repeatedly broke the rules during her stay in the house.
5 June – Launch of the BBC's Summer in the Sixties season with a night of classic TV from the 1960s on BBC Four, including episodes of Coronation Street, Z-Cars, Not Only But Also, and Call My Bluff. More 1960s programming is aired on 6 June, with episodes of World in Action and Till Death Us Do Part among the lineup.
7 June – Jane Danson returns to Coronation Street as Leanne Battersby after an absence of four years.
9 June – 
BSkyB unveil plans to launch a free-to-air service to rival Freeview.
Jurassic Park III makes its Network television premiere on ITV1.
11 June – BBC Four begins a re-run of the 1960s classic television series The Prisoner.
12 June–4 July – Euro 2004 is held in Portugal.
14 June – Quiz TV launches in the UK, one of the country's first phone-in quiz channels. Many more launched over the next few years, though Quiz TV itself would close down in 2006.
17 June – The live feed of Big Brother is taken off air as the housemates become aggressive and fight. Security guards are sent in to break up the fight, while Hertfordshire Police ask to view footage of the incident after being contacted by members of the public.
22 June – Mark Thompson takes over as Director-General of the BBC.
23 June – Channel 4 airs the final episode of the US sitcom Frasier.
24 June – The highest rated audience of the year is recorded in the UK as 20.66 million watch England's football match against Portugal in the quarter finals of Euro 2004. Viewing figures for any programme would not reach the 20 million mark again for another eight years, when England faced Italy at Euro 2012.

July
1 July – Andy Duncan succeeds Mark Thompson as Chief Executive of Channel 4.
3 July – BBC newsreader Natasha Kaplinsky and her dance partner Brendan Cole are crowned series champions as the first series of Strictly Come Dancing reaches its grand final.
5 July – 50th anniversary of television news broadcasts.
8 July – The first Schools edition of Question Time is aired on BBC One. Recorded in London, the panel is made up of guests chosen by the winners of the Schools Question Time Challenge.
15 July – The BBC broadcasts a documentary on the British National Party in which undercover reporter Jason Gwynne infiltrated the BNP by posing as a football hooligan. The programme results in Mark Collett and Nick Griffin, the leader of the party, being charged for inciting racial hatred in April 2005, for comments made in the film.
18 July – BBC Four airs a night of programming celebrating the work of Jack Rosenthal, including an episode of Coronation Street written by him.
27 July – Tiny Pop launched in the UK (2004–present)

August
6 August – Nadia Almada wins the fifth series of Big Brother.
8 August – EastEnders announce the introduction of a new family, the Millers, who will be seen on screen from September.
11 August – The Daily Mirror reports that a laptop stolen during a burglary at the home of a senior member of the EastEnders production team could lead to several months of major storylines being leaked as the computer contained scripts for upcoming episodes. 
12 August – Five signs a deal with Sony Pictures Television to premiere a number of films before they appear on pay-per-view platforms. These include the British television debut of Terminator 3: Rise of the Machines.
15 August – Channel 4 airs the 2000 musical film Coyote Ugly.
19 August – Channel 4's subscription film channel FilmFour announces it will be available to non-subscribers for the first weekend in October. The free weekend will coincide with the beginning of the channel's month long Killer Thrillers season.
31 August – Channel 4 airs Franklin for the very final time

September
September – The BBC airs the final episode of The Fresh Prince of Bel-Air, ending repeats.
4 September – Launch of the UK version of The X Factor, the first television programme produced by Simon Cowell's production company Syco. Cowell is joined on the judging panel by Louis Walsh and Sharon Osbourne.
5 September – ITV1 aired the 14th series of Heartbeat with the opening episode "Money, Money, Money" watched by 8.76 million viewers. 
11 September - Harry Hill became the narrator in series 16 of ITV's comedy clip show, You've Been Framed!, replacing Jonathan Wilkes. 
16 September – BBC One airs a special edition of Question Time to celebrate its 25th anniversary.
23 September – Bosses at Coronation Street confirm that Johnny Briggs (who plays Mike Baldwin) will leave the series in 2006, after agreeing an "exit strategy" with the actor.
27 September – 
ABC1, a channel from Disney, is launched in the UK.
EastEnders wins Best Soap at the Inside Soap Awards for the eighth year in a row.
28 September – ITV has signed a deal with Warner Bros to air film releases produced in 2003, 2004 and 2005. Titles include Harry Potter and the Chamber of Secrets, Harry Potter and the Prisoner of Azkaban, The Matrix Reloaded, The Matrix Revolutions and Troy.

October
1 October –
As part of its response to the Hutton Inquiry the BBC launches Newswatch, a programme providing a viewer and listener right-to-reply on BBC News's reporting and coverage of news events.
BBC Technology, incorporating the BBC's Broadcast Engineering division, is sold to Siemens Business Services for approximately £200m, and a £2bn, 10-year outsourcing contract.
ITV talk show host Trisha Goddard will move to Five in 2005 after signing a two-year contract with the broadcaster.
2 October - ITV1 aired the 4th series of Ant & Dec's Saturday Night Takeaway. 
4 October – 
UK television debut of the US version of The Apprentice with Donald Trump on BBC Two.
Peppa Pig begins its first broadcast on ABC in Australia.
13 October – 
The BBC, ITV and Channel 4 announce that audio description, which helps people with sight loss to follow television programmes by describing some of the visual content, is now available through Sky.
It is announced that the entire Ferreira family will leave EastEnders in Spring 2005.
21 October – BSkyB launch their free digital satellite TV service that offers viewers a selection of 140 TV and 80 radio channels for a one-off payment of £150.
27 October – British television premiere of the James Bond film Die Another Day on ITV1.
28 October – BBC One airs a special edition of Question Time from Miami, Florida, ahead of the 2004 US presidential election.
30 October – The BBC receives "hundreds of complaints" after reporter Barbara Plett describes herself crying when a frail Yasser Arafat was evacuated to France for medical treatment. Ultimately these complaints are partially upheld by the BBC Governors' Programme Complaints Committee.<ref>{{cite news|url= http://news.bbc.co.uk/2/hi/entertainment/4471494.stm|title= Arafat report 'broke BBC rules, BBC 25 November 2005 | date=25 November 2005 | access-date=2009-12-31 | work=BBC News}}</ref>

November
1 November – The digital television station ITV3 is launched at 9:00 pm, replacing Granada Plus.
5 November – 
Just over a year after his high-profile return to EastEnders, the BBC confirms that Leslie Grantham, who plays Den Watts will leave for a second time.
Re-runs of The Simpsons debut on Channel 4, having won the broadcasting rights from the BBC in February 2002, with episodes A Tale of Two Springfields and Treehouse of Horror XI.
10 November – British television premiere of the 2002 romantic comedy-drama film About a Boy starring Hugh Grant, Rachel Weisz and Nicholas Hoult. The film airs on ITV1 first, before being shown on BBC One on 14 November.
14 November – Five shows the UK terrestrial television premiere of Terminator 3: Rise of the Machines.
15 November – It emerges that Mersey Television boss Phil Redmond wrote to Secretary of State for Culture, Media and Sport offering to buy the publicly funded Channel 4. However, Ofcom says that the channel will not be privatised.
17 November – 
It is reported that merger talks between Channel 4 and Five have been called off after complexities arose between the public broadcaster Channel 4 and its commercial counterpart.
ITV1 airs the British television premiere of The Mummy Returns.
18 November – The video for the new charity single Do They Know It's Christmas? by Band Aid 20 airs simultaneously on all five main UK television networks, as well as over twenty satellite and cable stations. This unprecedented broadcast attracts 13.5 million viewers between 5:50 and 6:00pm.
24 November – A report by Ofcom has recommended that elderly and visually impaired people should be given financial assistance to help them buy equipment capable of receiving digital television before the analogue signal is switched off. The report suggests the government may need to set aside £250m–£400m to cover the cost of this.
26 November – Five airs the 2000th episode of its soap Family Affairs.
29 November – The BBC announces that Top of the Pops will move from its Friday evening BBC One slot to BBC Two, where it will air on Sunday evenings.

December
1 December – BBC News reports that the digital switchover trial has begun after Ferryside and Llansteffan had their digital signal switched on a few days earlier. The towns were chosen because they received their signal from a single relay which had poor reception, and residents report that their viewing experience has improved since digital transmission began.
2 December – BBC Two unveils its winter season of programming, which will include a major documentary, Auschwitz, to coincide with Holocaust Memorial Day.
4 December – "Thunderbirds Are Go" by Busted is voted the 2004 Record of the Year by ITV viewers.
5 December – ITV1 aired the 4th series of the medical drama series The Royal, with the opening episode watched by 9.43 million viewers.
6 December – Joe Pasquale wins the fourth series of ITV1's I'm a Celebrity, Get Me Out of Here!.
7 December – Netwise, the company that handled text voting for ITV's Record of the Year show says that thousands of customers who were accidentally overcharged will receive refunds after it emerged that some Virgin and T-Mobile users were charged multiple times for a single vote.
11 December – Steve Brookstein wins the first series of The X Factor. On the same evening, actress Jill Halfpenny and dance partner Darren Bennett win the second series of Strictly Come Dancing.
12 December – 
Double Olympic gold medalist Kelly Holmes is named as this year's BBC Sports Personality of the Year.
ITV1 airs Westlife: She's The One, a one-off X Factor-style programme following Irish boy band Westlife as they search for a fan to sing on their latest album Allow Us To Be Frank. Joanne Hindley from Bolton is chosen to accompany the band on their rendition of "The Way You Look Tonight".
Agatha Christie's Marple  makes its debut on ITV1 with the first episode watched by 8.72 million viewers.
24 December – 
Christmas Eve highlights on BBC One include the films: The Princess Diaries and Shrek.
Stan Richards makes his final appearance as Seth Armstrong in Emmerdale which he will be killed off a year later. Richards died in 11th February 2005 at the age of 74.
25 December – The first Harry Potter film, Harry Potter and the Philosopher's Stone makes its UK television debut on BBC One as part of the channel's Christmas Day lineup.
26 December – Overnight viewing figures suggest BBC One beat ITV in the Christmas Day battle of the ratings, with EastEnders watched by 12.3 million viewers and The Vicar of Dibley achieving an audience of 11.8 million. The television premiere of Harry Potter and the Philosopher's Stone was seen by 7.9 million. On ITV, Coronation Street attracted 11.3 million, while the first Midsomer Murders Christmas special received 6.3 million viewers.
27 December – Debut of Pride, Simon Nye's tale about two lion cubs growing up on the African plains, and which is aired on BBC One. The film features the voices of numerous British actors and uses CGI technology to enhance footage of actual lions and other animals.  
31 December – 
New Year's Eve highlights on BBC One include the network television premiere of the psychological thriller Don't Say a Word.
After five and a half years, Channel 4 has another rebrand replacing the previous squares idents with objects that transform into the Channel 4 logo.

Unknown
STV axes the lunchtime edition of Scotland Today.
Peppa Pig begins its first television screening in New Zealand on TV3.

Debuts

BBC One
1 January – Carrie's War (2004)
17 January – The Murder Room (2004)
2 February – Sea of Souls (2004–2007)
24 February – Hustle (2004–2012)
12 March – The Worst Week of My Life (2004–2006)
18 April – He Knew He Was Right (2004)
15 May – Strictly Come Dancing (2004–present)
6 July – 55 Degrees North (2004–2005)
9 July – Coming Home (2004–present)
3 September – Carrie & Barry (2004–2005)
6 September – Live at the Apollo (2004–present)
9 September – Should I Worry About...?  (2004–2005)
28 September – A Thing Called Love (2004)
16 October – Julian Fellowes Investigates: A Most Mysterious Murder (2004)
17 October – Himalaya with Michael Palin (2004)
14 November – North & South (2004)
26 December – Sherlock Holmes and the Case of the Silk Stocking (2004)

BBC Two
 15 February – Bella and the Boys (2004)
 20 February – Sex & Lies (2004)
 1 March - Look and Read: Shadow Play (2004)
 14 March – Gunpowder, Treason & Plot (2004)
 13 April – Hawking (2004)
 20 April – Happy Birthday BBC Two (2004)
 7 July – The Long Firm (2004)
 15 August – Match of the Day 2 (2004–present)
 29 September - Arrested Development (2003-2006, 2013; 2018–2019)
 12 October – Who Do You Think You Are? (2004–present)

BBC Three
 6 January – Nighty Night (2004–2005)
 18 May – The Mighty Boosh (2004–2007)
 24 May – Killing Time (2004)
 23 June – Bodies (2004–2006)
 29 June – The Smoking Room (2004–2005)

BBC Four
 15 January – The Alan Clark Diaries (2004)

BBC News 24
1 October – Newswatch (2004–present)

CBBC
8 March – Bamzooki (2004–2010)
21 September – Shoebox Zoo (2004–2007)

ITV (Including ITV1, ITV2 and ITV3)
5 January – The Sleepover Club (2003–2007) 
7 January – Powers (2004)
8 January – Unsolved (2004–2006)
10 January - Ministry of Mayhem (2004-2006)
16 February –
Life Begins (2004–2006)
24 Hour Quiz (2004)
13 March – Murder in Suburbia (2004–2005)
18 March – Murder City (2004–2006)
5 April - The Second Quest (2004)
19 April – 60 Minute Makeover (2004–present)
21 April – Shane (2004)
25 April – The Brief (2004–2005)
23 May – Hell's Kitchen (2004–2009)
7 June – 
Making Waves (2004)
A Line in the Sand (2004)
11 July – Island at War (2004)
13 July – My Life as a Popat (2004, 2007)
14 August – Sex, Footballers and Videotape (2004)
1 September – Steel River Blues (2004)
2 September – Doc Martin (2004–2019)
4 September – 
The X Factor (2004–2019)
Von Trapped (2004)
11 September – Beauty (2004)
18 September – King of Fridges (2004)
19 September – She's Gone (2004)
24 September – Orange Playlist (2004–2007)
26 September – Dirty Filthy Love (2004)
18 October – Tunnel of Love (2004)
24 October – Totally Spies! (2001-2008)
25 October – Whose Baby? (2004)
4 November – Blue Dove (2004)
15 November – Lie with Me (2004)
12 December – Agatha Christie's Marple (2004–2013)
20 December – Christmas Lights (2004)
27 December - The Final Quest (2004)

Channel 4
13 January – Shameless (2004–2013)
25 January – Comfortably Numb (2004)
2 March - No Angels (2004-2006)
7 March – The O.C. (2003–2007)
7 July – Supernanny (2004–2008, 2010–2012 as Extreme Parental Guidance)
24 August – NY-LON (2004)
3 September – Green Wing (2004–2007)
14 October – Sex Traffic (2004)
23 November – The Sex Inspectors (2004–2007)

Five
31 May – Peppa Pig (2004–present)
 7 June - The Gadget Show (2004-present)
11 September –
Beyblade G-Revolution (2004)
Duel Masters (2004-2005)
30 October – Murder Prevention (2004)

S4C
27 July – Clwb Winx (2004–2009)

Sky One
13 January – Nip/Tuck (2003–2010)
12 February – Cold Case (2003-2010)
13 April – Las Vegas (2003-2008)
17 October – Hex (2004–2006)
23 October – Power Rangers: Dino Thunder (2004)

Cartoon Network UK
5 January –  Whatever Happened to Robot Jones? (2002–2004)
5 April – Xiaolin Showdown (2003–2006)
30 October - Foster's Home for Imaginary Friends (2004–2009)
1 November -  Atomic Betty (2004–2008)

Nickelodeon UK
6 September – Drake & Josh (6 September 2004–16 September 2007)

Trouble
 7 June - Undergrads (2001)
 16 July - Run of the House (2003–2004)

Nicktoons UK
5 January – My Dad The Rock Star (2003–2004)
31 October – Danny Phantom (31 October 2004–24 August 2007)

Boomerang UK
2 February – Duck Dodgers (2004–2007)

Disney Channel UK
8 November - Brandy & Mr Whiskers (2004–06)

Fox Kids UK/Jetix UK
3 April – Sonic X (2002-04)
7 August – Martin Mystery (2003-2006)

Pop
3 February – Adventures of Sonic the Hedgehog (1993) 
27 May – Adventures of Sonic the Hedgehog (1993) (Sonic week on Pop in the UK – 65 Episodes) 
2 August – Sonic the Hedgehog (1993–1994)

Channels

New channels

Defunct channels

Rebranded channels

Television shows
Changes of network affiliation

Returning this year after a break of one year or longer
Postman Pat (1981, 1991–1994, 1996, 2004–2008).
Pingu (1986–1998, 2004–2006)
Tots TV (1993–1998, 2004–2009)
Fun Song Factory (1998, 2004)

Continuing television shows
1920s
BBC Wimbledon (1927–1939, 1946–2019, 2021–present)

1930s
The Boat Race (1938–1939, 1946–2019)

1950s
Andy Pandy (1950–1970, 2002–2005)
Panorama (1953–present)
What the Papers Say (1956–2008)
The Sky at Night (1957–present)
Blue Peter (1958–present)
Grandstand (1958–2007)

1960s
Coronation Street (1960–present)
Songs of Praise (1961–present)
Top of the Pops (1964–2006)
Match of the Day (1964–present)
Call My Bluff (1965–2005)
The Money Programme (1966–2010)

1970s
Emmerdale (1972–present)
Newsround (1972–present)
Superstars (1973–1985, 2003–2005)
Last of the Summer Wine (1973–2010)
Arena (1975–present)
One Man and His Dog (1976–present)
Top Gear (1977–2001, 2002–present)
Grange Hill (1978–2008)
Ski Sunday (1978–present)
Antiques Roadshow (1979–present)
Question Time (1979–present)

1980s
Children in Need (1980–present)
Timewatch (1982–present)
Countdown (1982–present)
The Bill (1984–2010)
Channel 4 Racing (1984–2016)
Thomas & Friends (1984–present)
EastEnders (1985–present)
Comic Relief (1985–present)
Casualty (1986–present)
ChuckleVision (1987–2009)
This Morning (1988–present)

1990s
Stars in Their Eyes (1990–2006, 2015)
A Touch of Frost (1992–2010)
Heartbeat (1992–2010)
Breakfast with Frost (1993–2005)
Room 101 (1994–2007, 2012–present)
Time Team (1994–2013)
The National Lottery Draws (1994–2017)
Top of the Pops 2 (1994–present)
Never Mind the Buzzcocks (1996–2015)
Silent Witness (1996–present)
Y Clwb Rygbi, Wales (1997–present)
Dream Team (1997–2007)
Family Affairs (1997–2005)
Midsomer Murders (1997–present)
Who Wants to Be a Millionaire? (1998–2014)
Bob the Builder (1998–present)
Holby City (1999–2022)

2000s
Doctors (2000–present)
Big Brother (2000–2018)
The Weakest Link (2000–2012, 2017–present)
The Kumars (2001–2006, 2014)
Popworld (2001–2007)
Real Crime (2001–2011)
UK Top 40 (2002–2005)
Harry Hill's TV Burp (2002–2012)
Flog It! (2002–2020)
Foyle's War (2002–2015)
I'm a Celebrity...Get Me Out of Here! (2002–present)
Spooks (2002–2011)
Angelina Ballerina (2002–2005)
Tiny Pop (2003–2008)
Daily Politics (2003–2018)
Peep Show (2003–2015)
New Tricks (2003–2015)
Politics Show (2003–2011)
QI (2003–present)
The Royal (2003–2011)
PointlessBlog (2003-2007)
This Week (2003–2019)

Ending this year

 ITV News at Ten (1967–1999, 2001–2004, 2008–present)
 Auf Wiedersehen, Pet (1983–1986, 2002–2004)
 Frasier (1993-2004)
 Animal Hospital (1994–2004)
 Changing Rooms (1996–2004)
 Liquid News (2000–2004)
 2DTV (2001–2004)
 As If (2001–2004)
 The Premiership (2001–2004)
 15 Storeys High (2002–2004)
 Bo' Selecta! (2002–2004)
 Fimbles (2002–2004)
 The Vault (2002–2004)
 Mr. Bean: The Animated Series (2002–2004, 2015–present)
 Born to Be Different (2003–2004''', 2006–2007, 2009, 2011–2013, 2016)
 Hardware (2003–2004)
 The Salon (2003–2004)
 The Smash Hits Chart Show (2003-2004)
 He Knew He Was Right (2004)
 The Long Firm (2004)
 Himalaya with Michael Palin (2004)
 North & South (2004)
 Robot Wars'' (1998-2004, 2016-2018)

Deaths

See also
 2004 in British music
 2004 in British radio
 2004 in the United Kingdom
 List of British films of 2004

References